Gregg Lee Carter (born 1951) is an American sociologist and professor of sociology at Bryant University in Smithfield, Rhode Island. His research focuses on gun violence, human ecology, and gender roles, among other subjects. He was educated at the University of Nevada, Las Vegas (B.A. in history and psychology) and Columbia University (M.A., M.Phil., and Ph.D. in sociology). He has written or edited 26 books, including the three-volume series Guns in American Society: An Encyclopedia of History, Politics, Culture, and the Law. He has been the president of the New England Sociological Association, and has received their "Sociologist of the Year Award", as well as the "Outstanding Contributions to Instruction Award" from the American Sociological Association's Sociology and Computers Section.

References

External links

1951 births
Living people
American sociologists
Bryant University faculty
Gun violence researchers
University of Nevada, Las Vegas alumni
Columbia Graduate School of Arts and Sciences alumni